Euplatyrhopalus is a genus of beetles in the family Carabidae, containing the following species:

 Euplatyrhopalus aplustrifer (Westwood, 1833) 
 Euplatyrhopalus armicornis (Fairmaire, 1896) 
 Euplatyrhopalus macrophyllus (Van De Poll, 1890) 
 Euplatyrhopalus simonis C.A. Dohrn, 1886  
 Euplatyrhopalus vexillifer Westwood, 1874 
 Euplatyrhopalus wasmanni Emden, 1927

References

Paussinae